The Cypriot Basketball Division B is currently the second-tier level men's professional basketball competition of the Cypriot basketball league system. It is run and governed by the Cyprus Basketball Federation.

Format
At present, eight clubs compete in the league.  One team (the last one) at the end of the season is promoted to the first division, whilst one team from the first division is relegated.

Teams
The following six teams (in alphabetical order) are competing in the 2017–18 season:

AEL - Limassol
Achilleas Agrou - Agros, Limassol
Achilleas Kaimakli - Kaimakli, Nicosia
Asteras - Mesa Geitonia, Limassol
ENAD - Ayios Dometios, Nicosia
Kentro Neon - Limassol
National Guard - Nicosia
Omonia - Nicosia

Champions

Performance by club

See also
 Cyprus Basketball Division A
 Cypriot Basketball Cup

References

Cyprus Basketball Federation Official Site 

 
Basketball leagues in Cyprus
Professional sports leagues in Cyprus